The Venezuela national under-17 football team represents Venezuela in international men's under-17 football competitions and is controlled by the Venezuelan Football Federation.

Competitive record

FIFA Under-17 World Cup record

South American Under-17 Football Championship record

*Draws include knockout matches decided on penalty kicks.

Current squad
The following players were selected to take part in the 2017 South American Under-17 Football Championship.

Manager:  José Hernández

References

External links

F
South American national under-17 association football teams